The Genie Awards were given out annually by the Academy of Canadian Cinema and Television to recognize the best of Canadian cinema from 1980–2012. They succeeded the Canadian Film Awards (1949–1978; also known as the "Etrog Awards," for sculptor Sorel Etrog, who designed the statuette).

Genie Award candidates were selected from submissions made by the owners of Canadian films or their representatives, based on the criteria laid out in the Genie Rules and Regulations booklet which is distributed to Academy members and industry members. Peer-group juries, assembled from volunteer members of the Academy, meet to screen the submissions and select a group of nominees. Academy members then vote on these nominations.

In 2012, the Academy announced that the Genies would merge with its sister presentation for English-language television, the Gemini Awards, to form a new award presentation known as the Canadian Screen Awards.

Broadcasting 
The Genie Awards were originally aired by CBC from 1979 to 2003, before moving to CHUM Limited's networks (Citytv, Bravo! and Star!).  After CTVglobemedia purchased CHUM Limited, the Genie Awards moved to Canwest Global's E and IFC for 2008. The last two Genie Awards (2011–2012) were broadcast by the CBC.

Awards ceremonies

The following is a listing of all Genie Awards ceremonies.

Awards presented until 2012

 Best Motion Picture
 Best Actor
 Best Actress
 Best Supporting Actor
 Best Supporting Actress
 Best Director
 Best Original Screenplay
 Best Adapted Screenplay
 Best Cinematography
 Best Art Direction/Production Design
 Best Costume Design
 Best Editing
 Best Overall Sound
 Best Sound Editing
 Best Visual Effects
 Best Make-Up
 Best Original Song
 Best Original Score
 Best Feature Length Documentary
 Best Short Documentary
 Best Live Action Short Drama
 Best Animated Short
 Golden Reel

Awards retired before 2012

 Best Performance by a Foreign Actor: 1980 to 1983
 Best Performance by a Foreign Actress: 1980 to 1983
 Outstanding TV Drama Under 30 Minutes: 1980 only
 Outstanding Independent Film: 1980 only
 Outstanding Performance by an Actor (Non-Feature): 1980 to 1981
 Outstanding Performance by an Actress (Non-Feature): 1980 to 1981
 Outstanding Art Direction (Non-Feature): 1980 only
 Outstanding Cinematography in a Dramatic Film (Non-Feature): 1980 only
 Outstanding Cinematography in a Documentary (Non-Feature Film): 1980 only	
 Outstanding Editing in a Dramatic Film (Non-Feature): 1980 only
 Outstanding Original Music Score (Non-Feature Film): 1980 only
 Outstanding Non-Dramatic Script: 1980 only
 Outstanding Sound in a Non-Feature Film: 1980 only

Special Achievement Genie
The Special Achievement Genie is an award given irregularly to an individual or individuals in recognition of lifetime achievement or an important career milestone.

See also
 Prix Jutra – Canadian French-language counterpart
 Canadian Screen Awards

Notes

External links
Academy of Canadian Cinema and Television

 
Awards established in 1980
Canadian film awards